Jonathan Hess (born 9 June 2000) is a German figure skater. He is the 2020 German national silver medalist and finished within the top ten at the 2018 World Junior Championships.

Career

Early years 
Hess began learning to skate in 2004. He won the German novice men's title in the 2014–15 season and moved up to juniors the following season. His ISU Junior Grand Prix (JGP) debut came in October 2016.

2017–2018 season 
Hess finished 12th at his sole JGP assignment, in Austria. In January 2018, he became the German national junior men's champion. In March, he competed at the 2018 World Junior Championships in Sofia, Bulgaria; he placed 7th in the short program, 10th in the free skate, and 10th overall.

2018–2019 season 
Hess competed at two JGP events at the start of the season. He made his senior international debut in October, placing fourth at the Halloween Cup in Budapest, Hungary. He did not compete at the German Championships.

Ranked 18th in the short, he qualified to the free skate and finished 22nd overall at the 2019 World Junior Championships in Zagreb, Croatia. It was his final season of junior eligibility.

2019–2020 season 
In January 2020, Hess won silver at the German Championships.

Programs

Competitive highlights 
CS: Challenger Series; JGP: Junior Grand Prix

References

External links 
 

2000 births
German male single skaters
Living people
Sportspeople from Regensburg